The following is a list of Bob Hope short subjects.  Hope was featured in twenty-six short subjects between 1934 and 1968.

Going Spanish (1934)
Paree, Paree (1934)
Calling All Tars (1935)
Double Exposure (1935)
The Old Grey Mayor (1935)
Soup for Nuts (1935)
Watch the Birdie (1935)
Shop Talk (1936)
Screen Snapshots Series 19, No. 6 (1940)
Hedda Hopper's Hollywood No. 4 (1942)
Don't Hook Now (1943)
Show Business at War (1943)
Strictly G.I. (1943)
The All-Star Bond Rally (1945)
Hollywood Victory Caravan (1945)
March of Time Volume 14, No. 1: Is Everybody Listening? (1947)
Weekend in Hollywood (1947)
Screen Actors (1950)
You Can Change the World (1951)
Screen Snapshots: Memorial to Al Jolson (1952)
Screen Snapshots: Hollywood's Invisible Man (1954)
Screen Snapshots: Hollywood Beauty (1955)
Showdown at Ulcer Gulch (1956)
The Heart of Show Business (1957)
Screen Snapshots: Hollywood Star Night (1957)
Rowan & Martin at the Movies (1968)

Lists of films by common content
Short film series
short